The Chamkani ( tsamkanī), also transliterated as Tsamkani or Samkani. In Paktia or Tribal dialect Chamkani  is transliterated as Tsekmani or Sekmani, is a Pashtun tribe 4th son of Ghoryakhel confederation. They are mainly based in Tsamkani District, Paktia Province, Afghanistan, but can also be found in Kurram District, which is called para Chamkani, and the Chamkani neighborhood of Peshawar in Khyber Pakhtunkhwa, Pakistan.

They took part in the frontier battles 1897, and during the Tirah campaign of that year a brigade under General Gaselee was sent to punish them.

Notable members of the Chamkani include Shoukat Aziz, a Pakistani human rights activist.

See also 

 Shoukat Aziz
 Kurram District

References

Sarbani Pashtun tribes
Ethnic groups in Paktia Province
Social groups of Pakistan